Zdzisław Wojdylak (3 October 1929 – 26 October 1987) was a Polish field hockey player. He competed at the 1952 Summer Olympics and the 1960 Summer Olympics.

References

External links
 

1929 births
1987 deaths
Polish male field hockey players
Olympic field hockey players of Poland
Field hockey players at the 1952 Summer Olympics
Field hockey players at the 1960 Summer Olympics
People from Inowrocław